Barein (also referred to as Baraïn, Barayin, Guilia, Jalkia or Jalkiya) is a Chadic language spoken in south central Chad.

Baraïn is spoken by 6,000 people living in 30 to 40 villages around Melfi in the Guéra region of southern Chad. Its main dialects are not mutually comprehensible, with speakers having to resort to Chadian Arabic in order to communicate with each other.

Jalkiya and Giliya (geographically and linguistically very close)
Jalking (Sakaya)
Komiya

Writing System

Notes

References 

 Dakouli, Padeu, Antje Maass, and David Toomey. 1996. Rapid appraisal of the Saba language of the Guera, Chad. N'Djamena: Association SIL. Manuscript.
 Lovestrand, Joseph. 2011. The dialects of Baraïn. SIL Electronic Working Papers. Dallas: SIL International. Online: http://www.sil.org/silewp/2011/silewp2011-011.pdf.
 Lovestrand, Joseph. 2012. The linguistic structure of Baraïn (Chadic). Dallas, TX: Graduate Institute of Applied Linguistics thesis. Online: https://web.archive.org/web/20131116215919/http://www.gial.edu/images/theses/Lovestrand_Joseph-thesis.pdf.
 Lukas, Johannes. 1937. Zentralsudanische Studien. Wörterverzeichnisse der Deutschen Zentral-Afrika-Expedition 1910–11, nachgelassene Aufnahmen von Gustav Nachtigal und eigene Sammlungen. Hansische Universität Abhandlungen aus dem Gebiet der Auslandskunde 45, Reihe B, Band 24. Hamburg: de Gruyter.
 Maass, Antje, Caroline Grant, Paul Huey, and Padeu Dakouli. 1996. Rapport d'enquête sociolinguistique : Première évaluation parmi les Barein du Guéra. N'Djamena: SIL; see also 2008 version: http://www.sil.org/silesr/abstract.asp?ref=2008-004.
 Rendinger, Général de. 1949. Contribution à l'étude des langues nègres du Centre-africain. Journal de la Société des Africanistes. 19(2). 143–194. Online: http://www.persee.fr/web/revues/home/prescript/article/jafr_0037-9166_1949_num_19_2_2599.

East Chadic languages
Languages of Chad